The Honest Courtesan is a 1992 biographical book by Margaret Rosenthal about a 16th-century Venetian courtesan named Veronica Franco.

Description
The Venetian courtesan has long captured the imagination as a female symbol of sexual license, elegance, beauty and unruliness. What then to make of the cortigiana onesta - the honest courtesan who recast virtue as intellectual integrity and offered wit and refinement in return for patronage and a place in public life? Veronica Franco (1546-1591) was such a woman, a writer and citizen of Venice, whose published poems and familiar letters offer rich testimony to the complexity of the honest courtesan's position.

Adaptation
In 1998, the film Dangerous Beauty was based on this book. The movie starred Catherine McCormack as Veronica Franco and was directed by Marshall Herskovitz. The film, also released as A Destiny of Her Own in some regions,  was re-titled The Honest Courtesan for video release in the United Kingdom and Europe in 1999.

First edition
The Honest Courtesan : Veronica Franco, Citizen and Writer in Sixteenth-Century Venice. Margaret F. Rosenthal. Chicago : University of Chicago Press, 1992.  (hardbound),  (paperback)

1992 books
Cultural depictions of Italian women